Perquín is a municipality in the Morazán department of El Salvador. It is home to the Museum of the Revolution, which contains artifacts and exhibits related to the Salvadoran Civil War. Exhibits include a recreation of Radio Venceremos, a civil war-era opposition radio station that was broadcast throughout the country and re-broadcast via short wave radio throughout the world during the 1980s. Today Radio Venceremos is a commercial radio station called la RV. Perquin is surrounded by coffee plantations and green pinegroves and hosts an annual festival that takes place during the first week of August.

See also
Prodetur – ecotourism organization active in Perquin

External links

Municipalities of the Morazán Department